Diego Alejandro Rivero (born 11 August 1981) is an Argentine football midfielder who plays for Atlas.

Career
Rivero started his career in 1998 with Chacarita Juniors in the Primera B Nacional (Argentine second division). In 1999 Chacarita were promoted to the Primera and Rivero continued to play for the club until their relegation in 2004.

Rivero then moved to Mexico to play for Pachuca (2004–2005) and later Cruz Azul (2005).

In 2005, Rivero returned to Argentina to play for San Lorenzo. In 2007, he helped the club to win the 2007 Clausura tournament.

In 2011, Rivero joined Boca Juniors, being part of a barter in which his club exchanged him for Boca's player Matías Giménez.

Achievements

Club 
San Lorenzo
Primera División: 1
 2007 Clausura

Boca Juniors
Primera División: 1
 2011 Apertura

References

External links

1981 births
Living people
Sportspeople from Misiones Province
Argentine footballers
Association football midfielders
Chacarita Juniors footballers
Cruz Azul footballers
San Lorenzo de Almagro footballers
Boca Juniors footballers
Argentinos Juniors footballers
Argentine Primera División players
Argentine expatriate footballers
Expatriate footballers in Mexico